"Re-Wired" is the second single from Kasabian's fourth album, Velociraptor!. First released digitally, the single has also been released as a limited 10 inch vinyl on 20 November 2011. Only 1,000 copies were made and were quickly sold out in 3 days through pre-orders.
A part of the song was used at half time in live Premier League football matches on Sky Sports during the 2011/2012 season, when a small round up of incidents during the match was played before a commercial break.

Music video
The band have released a video for the song, in which they drive various cars, being chased by a black 4x4. At the end they are caught and given a suitcase that glows as gold when opened and they remain speechless. Like the promo video for "Vlad The Impaler", this one also has a more humorous nature. In one scene, they are seen riding a five-seater bike, with Noel Fielding dressed up as Vlad the Impaler.

Track listing
Signed 10"

iTunes Single

Promo CD

Personnel
Kasabian
 Tom Meighan – lead vocals 
 Sergio Pizzorno – guitars, synthesizers, backing vocals
 Chris Edwards – bass
 Ian Matthews – drums
Additional personnel
Gary Alesbrook – trumpet
Mat Coleman – trombone
Andrew Kinsman – saxophone
London Metropolitan Orchestra – strings

Chart performance
In its second week of release, the song managed to briefly crack the Official UK Singles Chart at number 96 before falling off the chart. The main reason was the limited vinyl release and not a proper single one. It slowly climbed on the Belgium Tip Chart, to 13 in Flanders and 35 in Wallonia.

References

2011 singles
Kasabian songs
Songs written by Sergio Pizzorno